Epaphrodita is the type genus of praying mantids in the family Epaphroditidae; it had placed previously in the Hymenopodidae.

Species
Epaphrodita lobivertex
Epaphrodita musarum
Epaphrodita undulata

See also
List of mantis genera and species

References

Mantodea genera
Epaphroditidae